Assalé Molo Hilaire is an Ivorian former professional footballer who is last known to have been under contract to Manaw Myay of the Myanmar National League.

Early life

Influenced by Brazilian footballer Ronaldo and Ivorian Aruna Dindane after watching them play, Hilaire started football aged 7 and aimed to turn professional despite no support from his father.

Myanmar

After beginning with the Myanmar National League's Yadanarbon in 2010-11, Hilaire switched to Manaw Myay in 2012, bagging 15 goals and finishing as 5th on the scoring charts that season. Extending his contract for another year, the Ivorian forward targeted the top-scorer award for 2013, bagging 13 goals by early July that year.

References 

Association football forwards
Expatriate footballers in Libya
Ivorian expatriate footballers
Myanmar National League players
Ivorian footballers
Living people
Expatriate footballers in Mali
Expatriate footballers in Myanmar
Yadanarbon F.C. players
Year of birth missing (living people)
Ivorian expatriate sportspeople in Mali
Ivorian expatriate sportspeople in Myanmar